The Peel Sessions is a 1995 album by Trumans Water, released on the Strange Fruit label.  It collects all of the songs recorded during their three appearances on John Peel's BBC Radio 1 program.

Track listing 
11 May 1993:
1. "All Wet West of Washington" 3:17
2. "Long End of a Firearm" 8:32
3. "Large Organs" 2:57
4. "Seven Holes" 5:08
5. "Hair Junk Fiver" 1:33

Personnel:
Ely Moyal (Drums)
Kevin Branstetter (Bass, Backing vocals)
Glen Galloway (Guitar, Vocals)
Kirk Branstetter (Guitar, Backing vocals)
Will Prentice (Bulgarian pipes on tracks 1 and 2)

26 September 1993:
6. "Death to Dead Things" 2:54
7. "Girler Too" 4:17
8. "Esoterica of Abyssynia" [Sun City Girls cover] 3:28
9. "Kingdom of Heaven" [Nation of Ulysses cover] 1:44
10. "No Naked Lights" 1:28
11. "True Tilt Pinball" 2:14

Personnel:
Glen Galloway (Guitar, Vocals)
Kirk Branstetter (Guitar, Vocals)
Kevin Branstetter (Bass, Vocals)
Mike Mooradian (Drums, Vocals)

10 May 1994:
12. "Lick Observatory" 6:36
13. "Go-Go Dancer Solidified" 2:41
14. "Electro Muerta" 2:25
15. "Talking Hockey with Strangers" 5:04
16. "St. Job (Int'l Gore)" 3:06

Personnel:
Kevin Cascell (Drums, Piano, Vocals, Guitar on track 16)
Kevin Branstetter (Guitar, Piano, Vocals, Drums on track 16)
Kirk Branstetter (Guitar, Piano, Vocals)
Dean Pritchard (Exhaust pipe)

References

Peel Sessions recordings
Trumans Water albums
1995 live albums
1995 compilation albums